The INOTEK Foundation, a not-for-profit organization based in Jakarta, Indonesia, was founded in 2008 by Indonesians Sandiaga Salahudin Uno and Arief Surowidjojo. Inotek facilitates the development and dissemination of innovative technologies through invention-based enterprises.

Aims
Inotek aims to accelerate the growth of non-IT-technology-based small and medium enterprises that deliver both technology and business solutions to transform social and environmental problems and create sustainable economic growth in Indonesia. Supported by The Lemelson Foundation, Inotek identifies innovative individuals and companies and provides these entrepreneurs with mentoring services to hone their business strategy, develop management capacity and connect them to potential business partners.

Supported innovators
 Professor Ari Purbayanto has developed Suritech, a machine that separates bones and meat of small by-catch fish, making it more profitable for fishermen to sell the by-catch, rather than throw dead or dying fish back into the sea.
 Agus Cahyadi has developed octopus fishing gear.
 Prof. M. Nurhuda has developed the UB Kompor biomass cookstoves and through his company CV Kreasi Daya Mandiri, he has sold more than 12,000 stoves to distributors around the world.
 Hadi Apriliawan and team has developed SULIS, a new cost-effective method of milk pasteurization that destroys a larger percentage of harmful bacteria, while maintaining higher protein levels than traditional UHT methods.

Programs and projects 
 Mentoring  formerly named RAMP Indonesia supported by The Lemelson Foundation
 IDDGIS (Indonesian Demand-Driven Green Innovation Subprogram) supported by World Bank
 EEP Indonesia (Energy and Environment Partnership with Indonesia) is supported by the Ministry for Foreign Affairs of Finland and implemented in cooperation with the Directorate General of New, Renewable Energy and Energy Conservation of the Ministry of Energy and Mineral Resources of Indonesia

Notes

External links
 "About INOTEK". INOTEK Foundation. 
From Trash to Gas: A Biomass Stove Conserves $ and the Planet
 Indonesian Youth Win Awards for Global Innovation through Science and Technology
 EEP Indonesia
  Reducing Deforestation and GHG Emission with Biomass Stove and Fuel as Alternative Energy for a Community

Foundations based in Indonesia